Ashraf Habibullah is a Pakistani-American structural engineer and software developer best known as the founder, President, and CEO of Computers and Structures, Inc., a structural and earthquake engineering software company based in Berkeley, California. Upon founding the privately held company in 1975, Ashraf co-created the first structural-engineering software available to the personal computer, and has since created a suite of products, and developed their capabilities. Notably, ETABS, a multi-story building analysis and design software, received recognition as one of the Applied Technology Council and Engineering News-Record Top Seismic Products of the 20th Century. Today, CSI is recognized globally as the pioneer in the development of software for structural and earthquake engineering. CSI's software is used by thousands of engineering firms and is the choice of sophisticated design professionals in over 160 countries. Ashraf has a deep personal interest in the study of human psychology and human behavior and how they can be leveraged to help people from all walks of life reach their maximum potential.

Contributions

Financial support to students 
Recognizing the student financial needs for education at the university level Ashraf has funded a wide variety of organizations for scholarships for deserving students. Some of those organizations that he funded include:

 Student chapters of Structural Engineers Associations all across the United States
 Million dollar CSI Graduate Fellowship Endowment at UC Berkeley
 Earthquake Engineering Research Institute
 Structural Engineering Institute Futures Fund
 University of Karachi Alumni Association
 Women in Science and Engineering
 NED alumni associations across USA and Canada - Scholarship programs
 EERI - Student leadership Council
 EERI - Seismic Design Competition
 AISC - Bridge Design Competition
 ASCE- Concrete Canoe Design Competition 
Donations to universities and research organizations

Ashraf has donated software worth Millions of Dollars to hundreds of universities and other institutions all across the world for research and education purposes to ensure that the technology necessary to produce earthquake resistant structures reaches everyone. Some of the institutions include:

 University of California, Berkeley
 Iowa State University
 Stanford University
 Caltech
 Massachusetts Institute of Technology (MIT)
 Yale University
 Johns Hopkins University
 University of Illinois (UIUC)
 Purdue University
 Georgia Tech (GIT)
 University of Texas, Austin
 NED University of Engineering and Technology
 Asian Institute of Technology (AIT) Bangkok, Thailand
 Middle Eastern Technical University (METU) Ankara, Turkey
 UET Lahore and Peshawar
Donations for causes

Ashraf, a charismatic speaker, regularly donates his talent, time and resources for fundraisers to promote humanitarian, educational and social causes. Some of the causes he has funded include:

 Shaukat Khanum Cancer Hospital
 Imran Khan Cancer Appeal, Inc.
 Imran Khan dam Fundraiser
 Indus Hospital
 The Citizens Foundation (TCF)
 Developments in Literacy (DIL)
 Human Development Foundation (HDF)
 The Qalam School
 Khana Ghar
 The Hunar Foundation Inc.
 NUST College of E&ME
 GeoHazards International
 Afghan Relief fund

Structural engineering endowed chairs and fellowships 
With his longtime professional ties to Berkeley, and in honor of the faculty who guided him, Mr. Habibullah has donated millions of dollars to fund two departmental Chairs in structural engineering and two endowed fellowships.

Edward and Diane and Wilson Presidential Chair and Ray and Shirley Clough Presidential Chair and two CSI Presidential Graduate Fellowship in Structural Engineering to support research and education at University of California, Berkeley.

Technology seminars 
For nearly 50 years Ashraf had been conducting international seminars and courses to promote the understanding of numerical methods and techniques used in software for structural and earthquake engineering. His events are very well attended and are sponsored by universities and engineering universities all over the world.

Celebrating the profession 
Ashraf has contributed millions of dollars to sponsor events at international engineering conventions to promote the visibility and image of the structural engineering profession.

Awards and Citations 
 Structural Engineers Association of Northern California (SEAONC) H. J. Brunnier Lifetime Achievement Award  for changing the practice of structural engineering for the better with his development of efficient and usable structural analysis programs.
 American Society of Civil Engineers (ASCE) George Winter Award – in recognition of leading the development of highly complex software for structural analysis and design and founding the Engineers Alliance for the Arts and the Diablo Ballet.
 American Concrete Institute (ACI) Charles S. Whitney Medal for computer applications that have changed and modernized structural engineering practice to a level never envisioned just a few decades ago.
 Structural Engineers Association of Northern California (SEAONC) Community Involvement Award in recognition for his outstanding commitment to improve the public perception of structural engineering. 
 University of California, Berkeley Foundation Trustees' Citation Award for his service in campus fundraising. 
 Structural Engineering Institute President's Award in recognition of exemplary contributions to the success of SEI.
 San Francisco Business Arts Council Award for Outstanding Individual Contribution to the Arts Community.
 Contra Costs County Arts Council Award in recognition of his significant contributions to the arts and culture of the country.
 Applied Technology Council Award for Top Seismic product of the 20th Century for ETABS.
 Structural Engineers Association of Arizona (SEAOA) President's Award.
 University of California, Berkeley CEE Academy of Distinguished Alumni  in recognition of a distinguished professional career and lifelong dedication, support and advancement of Berkeley CEE.
 Structural Engineers Association of Southern California (SEAOSC) Honorary member.
 Structural Engineers Association of Northern California (SEAONC) Honorary member.
 Earthquake Engineering Research Institute (EERI) Honorary member.

Structural Engineering 
In 2010, Ashraf received the Structural Engineers Association of Northern California (SEAONC) H. J. Brunnier Lifetime Achievement Award for changing "the practice of structural engineering for the better with his development of efficient and usable structural analysis programs".

Additional recognition includes the 2011 American Concrete Institute (ACI) Charles S. Whitney Medal for "development of world-class computer applications",

The 2000 SEAONC Community Involvement Award for "enhancing the life safety, environmental health, and economic well-being of the public".

In 2013, he was inducted into the CEE Academy of Distinguished Alumni, which recognizes professional achievements and service to Berkeley. In 2014, he received a University of California, Berkeley Foundation Trustees' Citation Award  for his service to campus fundraising. He addressed as a keynote speaker at CALIFORNIA POLYTECHNIC STATE UNIVERSITY, SAN LOUIS OBISPO 2019 Fall Commencement.

Arts and culture 
Ashraf also has a keen passion for the arts and social causes. He is co-founder of the critically acclaimed Diablo Ballet in 1993 and the founder of the Engineer’s Alliance for the Arts in 1997, an organization that involves school children with technology, focusing on the artistic aspects of bridge engineering. He also received the 1998 Arts Recognition Award from the Arts and Culture Commission of Contra Costa County for Diablo Ballet and Ashraf received the American Society of Civil Engineers (ASCE) George Winter Award in 2005. for "commitment to the social and artistic needs of the community", 

For his involvement with both Diablo Ballet and the Engineers' Alliance for the Arts, Ashraf also received the San Francisco Business Arts Award for Outstanding Individual Contribution to the Arts Community in 2004.

A Short History of Computers & Structures, Inc. 
Ashraf is probably best known as the Founder, President, and CEO of Computers and Structures, Inc. (CSI)

Birth of CSI 
Ashraf Habibullah graduated from NED University of Engineering and Technology, Karachi, Pakistan in 1969 and then post-graduated from the University of California at Berkeley in December 1970. In 1974, within a few years of beginning his career as a structural engineer, he realized that much of the pioneering computer software that was being developed at UC Berkeley was not being used in practice by most structural engineers.  He was convinced that the application of such software would vastly enhance the quality and efficiency of structural engineers’ work, since so much of the work done in structural design lends itself to automation. With that in mind he approached Professor Edward L. Wilson, the chair of the division of structural engineering at UC Berkeley with a proposal to teach a course through the university targeted at practicing structural engineers. The course would bridge the gap between the research that was being conducted on campus and the work that was being practiced in the profession. The course was the first of its kind and was immediately popular. It was attended by hundreds of prominent engineers, project engineers and managers. Soon after the introduction of that course, Ashraf was inundated with offers from major firms who wanted to hire him as a consultant to apply the technology he presented in his courses to the projects that they were designing. At that point, at the end of 1975, he quit his job as a design engineer and established Computers and Structures, Inc. as a one-man company offering consulting services in computer applications for structural engineers.

Early years of CSI   
The software that was developed in the public domain at UC Berkeley was the foundation of Ashraf's consulting services. Major structural engineering companies would retain Ashraf to help them with their structural analysis and design.  Using computers, Ashraf would build computer models and execute automated designs. But because he was only a one-man shop, he immediately saw the value in modifying the software so that the computer would do more of the work.  After making extensive modifications, Ashraf had another revelation: With the software doing nearly all the work, he could license the software to his clients and train their engineers to use it, rather than act as the consultant himself. This was very well received by his clients and allowed him to focus on further software development and teaching. It is important to note that all this was during an era of mainframe computers and punched cards—long before personal computers or windows and before Microsoft and Apple had inundated our lives. In the early Eighties, Ashraf made the software available on personal computers and it spread worldwide instantly.

CSI today 
Today, nearly 50 years later, CSI is recognized globally as the pioneering leader in the development of software tools for structural and earthquake engineering. The software is used by thousands of engineering firms in over 160 countries for the design of landmark projects such as the Freedom Tower in New York City, the Burj Khalifa Tower in Dubai, and the Bird’s Nest Stadium in Beijing. Today the skyline of every major modern city in the world is defined by structures that have been designed using CSI software.

References



Year of birth missing (living people)
American structural engineers
Living people
Businesspeople from the San Francisco Bay Area
American technology chief executives
UC Berkeley College of Engineering alumni
D. J. Sindh Government Science College alumni
NED University of Engineering & Technology alumni
Pakistani emigrants to the United States
Structural engineers
People with acquired American citizenship